Richard C. Briggs High School was a secondary school located in Norwalk, Connecticut, USA. It opened in 1938 as a replacement for the Winnipauk School. Later it was turned into the secondary level Center for Vocational Arts but is now named after Dr. Richard C. Briggs, who was superintendent of Norwalk schools from 1971 to 1980.  Now Briggs High is an alternative to the two traditional high schools (Norwalk and McMahon).  Its current principal is Marie Allen. 

Briggs students have the opportunity to enroll in the Briggs-Norwalk Community College Academy, in which they can take college classes at Norwalk Community College while they are still in high school.  There is an active photography program at Briggs High School.

The class of 2007 included 22 graduates.

In January 2007 Briggs was listed by the ConnCAN educational research consultancy as number 7 in their list of Connecticut schools making significant progress in shrinking the gap between white and minority students on standardized test scores, and it was the only high school in the top 10 on the list.

In August 2008 the school underwent some external refurbishments that included a new sign and trees planted in front of the building.  Materials and labor were provided by volunteers from a nearby office of the General Electric corporation.
Briggs high school was renamed Norwalk Pathways Academy and then closed in 2018.

See also 
 Education in Norwalk, Connecticut

References

External links 
 Richard C. Briggs High School Website
 Norwalk Public Schools website
 Connecticut Coalition for Achievement Now (ConnCAN)

Public high schools in Connecticut
Schools in Fairfield County, Connecticut
Buildings and structures in Norwalk, Connecticut
Alternative schools in the United States